Eleni Kapogianni (born 24 August 1969, in Greece) is a professional Greek basketball coach of Panathinaikos women's team.

Under Kapogianni's guidance, Olympiacos won the Greek League and the Greek Cup undefeated in both the 2015–16 and the 2016–17 seasons.

References

External links
 Eleni Kapogianni - Hellenic Basketball Federation

1969 births
Living people
Panathinaikos women's basketball coaches
Olympiacos Women's Basketball coaches
Greek basketball coaches